Michael Paul France (born 10 September 1968 in Huddersfield, West Yorkshire) is a former professional footballer who played as a defender for Huddersfield Town.

While at Huddersfield he was sent on loan to Cobh Ramblers in November 1988 .

Following short stays at Bristol City and Burnley he moved into non-league football.

He was Altrincham's player of the year in his first season, and went on to combine playing for the club with positions as Football in the Community Officer at first Leeds United and then Huddersfield Town.

He left Altrincham in 1999, having played over 300 games for the club, and signed for Stalybridge Celtic. He later joined Ashton United, but had left by November 2001.

After football, he was Football in the Community Officer at Huddersfield Town and manager of the Sporting Pride Community Trust, based in Huddersfield. He is currently Deputy Chief Executive at Burnley FC in the Community.

References

1968 births
Living people
Footballers from Huddersfield
Association football defenders
English footballers
English Football League players
Huddersfield Town A.F.C. players
Bristol City F.C. players
Burnley F.C. players
Altrincham F.C. players
Stalybridge Celtic F.C. players
Ashton United F.C. players
Cobh Ramblers F.C. players
League of Ireland players